In South Africa, the Firearms Control Act 60 of 2000 regulates the possession of firearms by civilians. Possession of a firearm is conditional on a competency test and several other factors, including background checking of the applicant, inspection of an owner's premises, and licensing of the weapon by the police introduced in July 2004. In 2010, the process was undergoing review, as the police were not able to timely process either competency certification, new licences or renewal of existing licences. Minimum waiting period used to exceed 2 years from date of application. The Central Firearms Registry implemented a turnaround strategy that has significantly improved the processing period of new licences. The maximum time allowed to process a licence application is now 90 days.

Current law

In South Africa, citizens or permanent residents (over the age of 21 years generally, but if need can be shown then technically no age limit applies) who wish to own firearms are required to obtain a licence per individual firearm, and may possess a maximum amount of only four firearms, and a maximum of 200 rounds of ammunition per license. Should the individual acquire 'dedicated status' conferred by registered shooting club, the individual can theoretically license an unlimited amount of firearms and ammunition limits also then fall away.

Prohibited firearms

Prohibited firearms are:
Any fully automatic firearm;
any gun, cannon, recoilless gun, mortar, light mortar or launcher manufactured to fire a rocket, grenade, self-propelled grenade, bomb or explosive device;
any frame, body or barrel of such a fully automatic firearm, gun, cannon, recoilless gun, mortar, light mortar or launcher;
any projectile or rocket manufactured to be discharged from a cannon, recoilless gun or mortar, or rocket launcher;
any imitation of any device contemplated in paragraph (a), (b), (c), or (d);
any firearm—
the mechanism of which has been altered so as to enable the discharging of more than one shot with a single depression of the trigger;
the caliber of which has been altered without the written permission of the Registrar;
the barrel length of which has been altered without the written permission of the Registrar;

Semi-automatic rifles and shotguns

Semi-automatic firearms are not prohibited under law. However, semi-automatic long guns are only permitted with a business licence, restricted firearms licence for self-defence, and dedicated hunting and shooting licences. There is no official magazine capacity restriction for semi-automatic rifles.

Handguns

Handguns of all firing actions (except fully automatic) are legal under all licences. There is no magazine capacity restriction for handguns.

Carrying of firearms in public

Carrying legally owned firearms in South Africa is legal under all licence types and requires no additional permit. No person may carry a firearm in a public place unless the firearm is carried:

 in the case of a handgun—
 in a holster or similar holder designed, manufactured or adapted for the carrying of a handgun and attached to his or her person; or
 in a rucksack or similar holder; or
 in the case of any other firearm, in a holder designed, manufactured or adapted for the carrying of the firearm.
A firearm contemplated in subsection 
 must be completely covered and the person carrying the firearm must be able to exercise effective control over such firearm (carrying firearms in public is allowed if done in that manner).

Prohibited places (Firearm-free zones) 

In South Africa, private guns are prohibited by law as per the Control of Access to Public Premises and Vehicles Act of 1985 (CAPPVA), in government buildings. The Firearms Control Act of 2000 does allow for firearm-free zones, but this must not be confused with the mandate of the CAPPVA of 1985, which has effectively made all government buildings and vehicles firearm-free by law without the input of the FCA which came about almost two decades later. According to the Firearms Control Act of 2000 under Section 140, firearm-free zones can be applied for and must be granted FFZ status by the Minister of Police. It is worth noting the difference between Gun Free Zones (GFZ) and a Firearm Free Zones (FFZ). GFZ's are more voluntary and according to Gun Free SA "It is a civil offence to contravene the Gun Free Zone status of a premises, which means that anyone found breaking that law can be prosecuted under the laws that prohibit trespassing. Signs tell people entering this type of Gun Free Zone that the space is gun free. People entering this space are not asked to declare if they are carrying a gun and are not searched for a gun. While guns are not taken away from people, they know that guns are not welcome". FFZ's on the other hand are enforced by law and carry severe penalties of up to 25 years in prison. According to Section 140 of the Firearms Control Act of 2000, police may without warrant, search any building or premises if there’s reasonable suspicion that a firearm or ammunition may be present within an FFZ; search any person within an FFZ; and seize any firearm or ammunition present within an FFZ. On the 7th of May 2004, the Minister of Police issued the notice 749 of 2004 in the Government Gazette of new legislation that declared all schools and other learning institutions, including institutions for higher education, as firearm-free zones in terms of Section 140 of the Firearms Control Act of 2000, which came into operation on the 1st of July 2004. To date, there have been no firearm-free zones declared by the Minister.

Licence types

Licence to possess firearm for self-defence

This licence under chapter 6 section 13, allows the holder to possess any:
shotgun which is not fully or semi-automatic; or
handgun which is not fully automatic.
The Registrar may issue a licence under this section to any natural person who:
needs a firearm for self-defence; and
cannot reasonably satisfy that need by means other than the possession of a firearm.

Licence to possess firearm for occasional hunting and sports-shooting

This licence under chapter 6 section 15, allows the holder to possess any:
handgun which is not fully automatic;
rifle or shotgun which is not fully or semi-automatic; 
The Registrar may issue a licence in terms of this section to any:
natural person who is an occasional hunter or occasional sports person (ex. A person who participates in target shooting but is not an official member of an official target shooting club or a person who participates in hunting but is not an official member of an official hunting club)

Licence to possess firearm for dedicated hunting and dedicated sports-shooting

This licence under chapter 6 section 16, allows the holder to possess any:
handgun which is not fully automatic;
rifle which is not fully automatic;
shotgun which is not fully automatic;
semi-automatic shotgun;
The Registrar may issue a licence in terms of this section to any:
natural person who is a dedicated hunter or dedicated sports person if the application is accompanied by a sworn statement or solemn declaration from the chairperson of an accredited hunting association or sports-shooting organisation, or someone delegated in writing by him or her, stating that the applicant is a registered member of that association (ex. A person who goes target shooting and is an official member of an official target shooting club or a person who goes hunting and is an official member of an official hunting club)

Licence to possess firearm for professional hunting

This licence under chapter 6 section 16

Licence to possess firearm in private collection

Permit to possess ammunition in private collection

This permit allows the holder to possess any:
piece or pieces of firearms ammunition (NOTE: Not required for people who have licences for other guns)

Licence to possess firearm, and permit to possess ammunition, in public collection

Licence to possess firearm for business purposes

This licence allows the holder to possess any:
firearm that isn't prohibited
The Registrar may issue a licence in terms of this section to:
a security company;
a person who is accredited to provide training in the use of firearms;
a person who is accredited to provide firearms for use in theatrical, film or television productions;
a person who is accredited as a professional hunter;
a person who is accredited to conduct business in hunting; or
any person who is accredited to use firearms for such other business purpose as the Registrar may determine

Legal framework

The Firearms Control Act 60 of 2000 & Regulations, together with amendments and regulations form the legal framework for gun ownership in South Africa. All current firearms owners, approximately 2.6 to 3 million according to the SA Central Firearm Registry (which is less than 6% of the population), are required by the Act to re-register their firearms . Its constitutionality is currently being challenged in two high-profile cases.

The South African Hunters Association has successfully challenged the transitional provisions to the implementation of the act, meaning that the full implementation of the Act has been placed on hold for several years now. The government has failed to challenge the interim ruling of North Gauteng High Court Judge Bill Prinsloo. The South African Gunowners Association (SAGA) have applied to have Bill Prinsloo's interim judgement confirmed and made permanently binding. Other parties including Gun Owners of South Africa (GOSA) have raised constitutional challenges to aspects of the FCA in particular the government's non-compliance with compensation aspects of the law. The argument is that if a citizen is deprived of property, e.g. the surrender of a firearm, due to compliance with the act, the government must compensate the citizen for lost property, as is provided for in the act.

Criticism and legal challenges

The Black Gun Owners Association of South Africa (BGOASA) is challenging the loss of revenue and employment, and is seeking compensation for the loss of income. Furthermore, it is challenging the political motivations of the act as Abios Khoele, chairperson of the Black Gun Owners Association, told a press briefing in Johannesburg: "This government is hell-bent on disarming black people because they've made so many service delivery promises to them which they have not fulfilled. They are scared that if blacks are armed they will turn on the government."

In July 2010, the BGOASA, filed a R3.2 Billion lawsuit against the government in regards to the poor implementation of the firearms act, claiming 40,000 Black people were refused firearm licences between 2004 and 2010. which is claimed to have cost 10,000 jobs in the firearms sector and closed 800 shops. Licensing takes over two years to process before revenue can be recognised or is arbitrarily dismissed and rejected by the police. These two factors lead to many dealers not being able to maintain their businesses, in light of greatly reduced revenues.

On 30 November 2012, the Supreme Court of Appeal dismissed an order brought by a group of gun owners that would have compelled the minister of police to pay compensation for all firearms voluntarily surrendered for destruction under the Firearms Control Act 2000.

Illegal possession 
Official statistics show that more than 12,900 people were arrested for possessing illegal firearms from 2020 to 2021. The Democratic Alliance party alleges that more than 3,400 police firearms had been unaccounted for during the five years preceding 2022. Following a spate of shootings in July 2022 that killed 22 persons using weapons such as AK-47 rifles, South Africa Police Minister Bheki Cele said they would search house to house to find illegal guns.

References

External links
 Firearms Control Act, 2000 (Act 60 of 2000) 
 Gun Free South Africa
 Gun Owners of South Africa
 South African Gunowners Association

South_Africa
Law of South Africa